Rolling Love is a 2008 Taiwanese drama starring Jiro Wang of Fahrenheit, Danson Tang, Genie Chuo and Xiao Xun of Hey Girl. It was produced by Comic International Productions (可米國際影視事業股份有限公司) and directed by Mingtai Wang (王明台). The drama started filming on 30 October 2007 and wrapped on 21 March 2008. It was filmed on location in Jinshan, Taipei, Taiwan.

It was first broadcast in Taiwan on free-to-air China Television (CTV) (中視) from 4 May 2008 to 7 July 2008, every Sunday at 22:00 to 23:30 and cable TV Gala Television (GTV) Variety Show/CH 28 (八大綜合台) from 10 May 2008 to 26 July 2008, every Saturday at 21:00 to 22:30.

Synopsis
Mi Qi Lin(米麒麟) (Jiro Wang) is the chef of lunchtime diner "Egg Fried Rice" in a village by the sea in Jinshan, Taipei that only serves a popular egg fried rice dish. However little does people, outside of the village, know that this infamous egg fried rice dish is the only thing that he knows how to cook. He relies on this skill that his father passed onto him, and earns a reputation and a living by cooking 100 plates of it every day. 
 
In another world, there is Leng Lie (冷冽) (Danson Tang), a young talented chef, who graduated from the best cordon bleu school at 14 years old and regarded by many for his near perfect cuisine. He is admired as a representative of the highest standards and by women as their Mr Perfect. He is the executive chef at Imperial Hotel, owned by his father. However he has one regret in his heart ...

Two years ago on Valentine's Day, the day Leng Lie planned to confess his feeling to his childhood sweetheart Guan Xiao Shu (關小舒) (Genie Chuo), they were involved in a car accident. As a result, Xiao Shu, a singer/songwriter, lost her sight. Naturally Leng Lie feels responsible but Xiao Shu refuse to blame him and did not change her happy outlook to life. However every time he talks to her about their future together, she turns him down, not wanting a love based on remorse.

Until one day, Xiao Shu arrives at Mi Qi Lin's diner and tasted his egg fried rice. This simple and plain dish had an odd effect on her, she felt relaxed and carefree, giving her a sweet taste of happiness. Upon meeting Xiao Shu, Mi Qi Lin experiences many flavours of food and love and likewise, Mi Qi Lin's frank nature gives Xiao Shu the ability to cultivate an independent lifestyle. All the while, the growing feelings between Xiao Shu and Mi Qi Lin is witnessed by Leng Lie.

Cast

Soundtrack

Rolling Love Original Soundtrack (CD+DVD) (翻滾吧！蛋炒飯 電視原聲帶) was released on 13 June 2008 by Various artists under Rock Records. It contains eleven songs, in which five songs are various kala versions of the songs. Two versions were released for the album: CD+VCD edition (with lyrics photo booklet and a VCD), and CD+DVD edition (with lyrics photo booklet, TV drama recipe cards, and a DVD). The track, "永不消失的彩虹" (Never Ending Rainbow) by Genie Chuo was the ending theme song of the TV series.

Track listing

In addition, there are two songs not included in the original soundtrack: The opening theme song, which is "恆星" or "Shining Star" by Fahrenheit from their Love You More and More album, and an insert song by Danson Tang entitled "Tell Me", released in his D's New Attraction album.

Books
 12 May 2008: Rolling Love Photobook (翻滾吧！蛋炒飯幕後紀實) - 
 23 May 2008: Rolling Love TV Drama Novel (翻滾吧！蛋炒飯電視小說) -

Reception

Rival dramas on air at the same time:
 Taiwan Television (TTV) (台視): Fated to Love You
 Chinese Television System (CTS) (華視): Wish To See You Again (這裡發現愛) / Honey & Clover (蜂蜜幸運草)

References

External links
 CTV Rolling Love official homepage
 GTV Rolling Love official homepage

China Television original programming
Gala Television original programming
2008 Taiwanese television series debuts
2008 Taiwanese television series endings